Harry Equid (8 October 1923 – 2 February 1984) was an Australian rules footballer who played for Essendon in the Victorian Football League (VFL) during the 1940s.

Football
Equid began his VFL career after serving with the army in World War II and made his debut against North Melbourne, in the final game of the 1945 season, kicking three goals. In 1946 he continued where he had left off and started the season with a goalscoring sequence of three, three and seven. He finished the year with 35 goals, the last of which came from the half forward flank in Essendon's Grand Final win over Melbourne.

He was also used as a follower.

After making just seven appearances in 1947, which included six goals against Footscray, Equid had his final season in 1948 and played his last game in his club's losing Grand Final team.

Coburg (VFA)
He then went to the Victorian Football Association and captain-coached Coburg from 1949 until 1951, playing one further year with the club in 1952. He winning the club's best and fairest award in 1949.

He then played for Kyneton in 1953 and South Mildura in 1954.

Place-kicks
He was one of the very few players of his era to favour the place kick when shooting for goal.

On 7 August 1949 (by then he was playing with Coburg), he took part in a goal-kicking competition conducted during the half-time break during a charity match between the Essendon District Football League and the Footscray District Football League. Each player had nine shots at goal from about 50 yards out: three from the left side of the goal, three from the right side of the goal, and three from straight in front. Using place-kicks, and competing against Footscray's Charlie Sutton, who kicked drop-kicks, and Essendon's John Coleman, who kicked punt kicks, Equid won the contest.

Notes

References
 Holmesby, Russell and Main, Jim (2007). The Encyclopedia of AFL Footballers. 7th ed. Melbourne: Bas Publishing.

External links
 
 Essendon Football Club profile

1923 births
1984 deaths
Australian Army personnel of World War II
Australian rules footballers from Victoria (Australia)
Australian Rules footballers: place kick exponents
Essendon Football Club players
Essendon Football Club Premiership players
Coburg Football Club players
Coburg Football Club coaches
One-time VFL/AFL Premiership players